Ronaldo Pineda (born August 26, 1996) is an American soccer player who plays as a midfielder for Chattanooga Red Wolves SC in USL League One.

Career

Chattanooga Red Wolves
In 2019, Pineda played as a member of Chattanooga's USL League Two affiliate team Park City Red Wolves. This paved the way for him to sign with the USL League One club in January 2020. He made his league debut for the club on July 25, 2020 against Tormenta FC.

References

External links
Ronaldo Pineda at Cal State Fullerton Athletics

1996 births
Living people
FC Golden State Force players
Chattanooga Red Wolves SC players
USL League Two players
USL League One players
American soccer players
Soccer players from California
Association football midfielders
Sportspeople from Santa Ana, California
Cal State Fullerton Titans men's soccer players